KPGR (88.1 FM) is a radio station broadcasting an Indie & Local format. Licensed to Pleasant Grove, Utah, United States. The station is currently owned by Alpine School District. Students take a beginning radio class as sophomores and juniors; those who pass the class try out for DJ positions on the radio, and only 26 students are chosen. KPGR is completely run by students from 6:30 a.m. to 10p.m., Monday through Friday; on weekends and holidays the station is run by an automated system.

References

External links

PGR
Contemporary hit radio stations in the United States